Martina Eberl (born 29 June 1981) is a German professional golfer. She played on the Ladies European Tour (LET) between 2003 and 2012 and won four tournaments.

In addition to her four LET wins, Eberl was runner-up at the 2004 BMW Ladies Italian Open, one stroke behind Ana Belén Sánchez, and again at the 2006 Ladies English Open, one stroke behind Cecilia Ekelundh, and in 2008 lost a playoff to Lotta Wahlin at the Wales Ladies Championship of Europe. She was also runner-up at the 2008 European Nations Cup, partnering with Anja Monke. Eberl finished third on the 2008 Order of Merit.

After retiring from tour, she became a golf coach at Golf Club Eschenried in Munich.

Amateur wins
2002 Spanish International Ladies Amateur Championship

Professional wins

Ladies European Tour wins (3)

Other wins (1)
2007 The 18 Finest (unofficial tournament sanctioned by the Ladies European Tour)

Team appearances
Amateur
European Ladies' Team Championship (representing Germany): 1999, 2001
Espirito Santo Trophy (representing Germany): 1998, 2000, 2002
Junior Ryder Cup (representing Europe): 1999 (winners)
European Lady Junior's Team Championship (representing Germany): 2002

References

External links

German female golfers
Ladies European Tour golfers
Sportspeople from Munich
1981 births
Living people
21st-century German women